Stranice našeg vremena is the third studio album by the Serbian band Smak, released in 1978.

Track listing

Personnel 
 Boris Aranđelović - vocals
 Radomir Mihajlović "Točak" - guitar
 Tibor Levay - keyboards
 Zoran Milanović - bass
 Slobodan Stojanović "Kepa" - drums

Guest
 David Moss - Congas, Timbales, Maracas, Castanets, Gong, Cabasa

External links

Smak albums
1978 albums
Serbian-language albums